Homer and Jethro Go West  is a studio album released by Homer and Jethro in 1963 on RCA Victor LP record LPM-2674 (mono) and LSP-2674 (stereo).  The album cover art is by Jack Davis.  The album received renewed publicity in August 1964.

Track listing

References 

1963 albums
Homer and Jethro albums
RCA Victor albums
Albums with cover art by Jack Davis (cartoonist)
1960s comedy albums